Heinschenwalde is a railway station in northwestern Germany. It is owned and operated by EVB, with regular trains on the line between Bremerhaven and Buxtehude.

Train services
The station is served by the following services:

Local services  Cuxhaven - Bremerhaven - Bremervörde - Buxtehude

References

Railway stations in Lower Saxony
Eisenbahnen und Verkehrsbetriebe Elbe-Weser